The 2016 Cactus Bowl was a post-season American college football bowl game played on January 2, 2016 at Chase Field in Phoenix, Arizona. This was the twenty-seventh edition of the Cactus Bowl, which was originally known as the Copper Bowl, Insight.com Bowl, the Insight Bowl, and the Buffalo Wild Wings Bowl.  Sponsored by the Motel 6 chain of budget motels, the game was officially known as the Motel 6 Cactus Bowl.

The bowl featured the West Virginia Mountaineers of the Big 12 Conference against the Arizona State Sun Devils of the Pac-12 Conference, and was the concluding game of the season for both teams. It began at 8:15 p.m. MST and aired on ESPN. It was one of the 2015–16 bowl games that concluded the 2015 FBS football season and was the final bowl game prior to the 2016 College Football Playoff National Championship game.

Motel 6 took over as title sponsor of the game replacing TicketCity, who had served as sponsor of the previous year's game.

The 2016 Cactus Bowl marked the game's return to Chase Field, its home from 2000 until 2005, after a ten-year absence during which the game was played at Sun Devil Stadium in Tempe, Arizona. The move was made due to a reconstruction project at Sun Devil Stadium that rendered the facility unusable during the college football offseason and would see Chase Field host the Cactus Bowl through 2018. West Virginia won the game by a final score of 43-42.

Teams
The game featured the West Virginia Mountaineers against the Arizona State Sun Devils.

Arizona State Sun Devils

After finishing their season 6–6, the Sun Devils accepted their invitation to play in the game.

This was also the Sun Devils' second Cactus Bowl; they had previously won the 2005 Insight Bowl over Rutgers 45–40.

West Virginia Mountaineers

After finishing their season 7–5, the Mountaineers accepted their invitation to play in the game.

This was the Mountaineers' second Cactus Bowl; they had previously lost the 1998 Insight.com Bowl to Missouri 34–31.

Game summary

Scoring summary

Source:

Statistics

References

2015–16 NCAA football bowl games
2016,01
2016 Cactus Bowl
2016 Cactus Bowl
2016 in sports in Arizona
January 2016 sports events in the United States
2016 Cactus Bowl